Mohamed Boussaïd (or Boussaid) is a name. People with that name include:
 Mohamed Boussaïd (born 1991), Algerian footballer
 Mohamed Boussaid (born 1961), Moroccan politician

Boussaid, Mohamed